The British Colonial Auxiliary Forces referred to the various military units of Britain's colonial empire which were not considered part of the British military proper. Though the first colonial units established in the British Empire were militia formations in Britain's American colonies, by the Victorian era these units were modelled after the regular armed forces of Britain and consisted of professional soldiers. They supplied a reserve force either to be called up in war time to reinforce regular British Army garrisons for home defence, or in some cases were entirely responsible for home defence. Many units, however, took part in active campaigns outside of the role of home defence in various conflicts the British Empire was involved in, including the two world wars.

Some of the reserve colonial units, especially in the strategically-important imperial fortress colonies (consisting of Halifax, Gibraltar, Bermuda and Malta), were funded by the War Department out of Army Funds and considered part of the British Army (by example, the Bermuda Militia Artillery was grouped with the Royal Artillery and the Bermuda Volunteer Engineers with the Royal Engineers in the official Army Lists, which also listed the Bermuda Volunteer Rifle Corps and Bermuda Militia Infantry officers as part of the British Army, whereas most colonial units were listed separately or did not appear at all), whereas others that did not receive Army Funds were considered auxiliaries (British military units, but not part of the British Army). This had originally been true of various other military forces in the United Kingdom before the mid-Nineteenth Century, following which the Board of Ordnance was abolished and its military corps (the Royal Artillery, Royal Engineers, and Royal Sappers and Miners) and previously-civilian Commissariat, stores and transport departments were all absorbed by the British Army and the Militia, Yeomanry and Volunteer Forces were more closely integrated with the British Army through a succession of military reforms.

Many colonial units started out as auxiliaries and later became regular units and forerunners to the current militaries of those colonies which have become politically independent. While most of the units listed here were army units, colonial marines were raised at various times, as were colonial naval and air force reserve units. Today, only four British Overseas Territories regiments remain (not including cadet corps): the Royal Bermuda Regiment; the Royal Gibraltar Regiment; the Falkland Islands Defence Force; and the Royal Montserrat Defence Force. The British Government is currently (2020) working with the local governments of the Turks and Caicos Islands and the Cayman Islands to raise reserve military units in those territories, also, with recruitment for the new Cayman Islands Regiment starting in January, 2020.

List of  Colonial Auxiliary Forces

Aden
 Aden Protectorate Levies

Africa
 King's African Rifles garrisoned the East African colonies of Nyasaland, Kenya, Uganda and British Somaliland.
 Royal West African Frontier Force garrisoned the West African colonies of Nigeria, Gold Coast, Sierra Leone and Gambia.

America
Provincial troops in the French and Indian Wars
 Corps of Colonial Marines
American Legion (1780-1783)
American Volunteers (1779-1780)
Armed Boat Company (1781-1783)
Black Company of Pioneers (also, known as the Black Pioneers, later merged into the Guides and Pioneers in 1778), (pioneers, another name for military construction engineers) (1777-1778)
British Legion (placed on American establishment in 1781 as 5th American Regiment) (1777-1778)
Bucks County Dragoons (absorbed by British Legion in 1780) (1778-1780)
Butler's Rangers (1777-1784)
Caledonian Volunteers (formed part of the British Legion in 1778) (1777-1778)
Campbell's Dragoons (South Carolina Dragoons) (1781)
Canadian Companies (1777-1783)
Claus' Rangers (1775-1783)
Collett's Independent Company (1777)
De Lancey's Brigade (1776-1783)
Detroit Volunteers (claimed descent from Roger's Rangers, later became 1st Battalion 119th Field Artillery Regiment, Michigan National Guard) (1778-1783)
Diemar's Troop of Black Hussars (also, known as Diemar's Hussars and Black Hussars, hussars, (light cavalry) (1779-1781)
Duke of Cumberland's Regiment (1781-1783)
Duchess County Company (1776-1777)
Emmerich's Chasseurs (chasseurs / light cavalry) (1777-1779)
Fenwick's Dragoons (South Carolina Dragoons) (1781)
Forshner's Independent Company (1780-1781)
Georgia Light Dragoons (there was also, a Local Volunteer Corps unit, of the same name) (1779-1781)
Georgia Loyalists (1779-1782)
Governor Wentworth's Volunteers (1777-1781)
Guides and Pioneers (absorbed the Black Company of Pioneers in 1778) (1778-1783)
Harkimer's Batteau Company (1780-1783)
Hierlihy's Corps
James Island Light Dragoons
King's American Dragoons
King's American Regiment (placed on American establishment, in 1781, as 4th American Regiment, part of the regular, British Army) (1776-1783) 
King's Rangers
King's (Carolina) Rangers
King's Orange Rangers
King's Royal Regiment of New York
Kinloch's Light Dragoons (formed part of the British Legion in 1778)
Locke's Independent Company
Loyal American Rangers (1780-1783)
Loyal American Regiment
Loyal Foresters
Loyal New Englanders
Loyal Rangers
Loyal Rhode Islanders
Maryland Loyalists Battalion
McAlpin's Corps (also, known as McAlpin's Corps of Royalists, absorbed the American Volunteers, King’s Loyal Americans, Queen’s Loyal Rangers, and Adams' Rangers)
Nassau Blues
Newfoundland Regiment (placed on British establishment in 1782)
New Hampshire Volunteers
New Jersey Volunteers (Skinner's Greens)
Newport Artillery Company (Rhode Island) 1741
New York Volunteers (placed on American establishment, as 3rd American Regiment in 1779)
North Carolina Highlanders
North Carolina Independent Company
North Carolina Independent Dragoons
Pennsylvania Loyalists
Philadelphia Light Dragoons (formed part of the British Legion in 1778)
Prince of Wales's American Volunteers
Provincial Light Infantry
Queen's Rangers (placed on American establishment, in 1779, as 1st American Regiment, descended from Roger's Rangers)
Roman Catholic Volunteers (1777-1778)
Royal American Reformers
Royal Fencible Americans
Royal Garrison Battalion (placed on British establishment in 178
Royal Georgia Volunteers
Royal Highland Emigrants (placed on British establishment in 1779 as 84th Foot)
Royal Nova Scotia Volunteer Regiment
Saint John's Volunteers
Starkloff's Dragoons (South Carolina Dragoons) (1781)
South Carolina Rangers
South Carolina Royalists
Stewart's Troop of Light Dragoons
Van Alstine's Batteau Company
Volunteers of Ireland (absorbed the Roman Catholic Volunteers and New Jersey Volunteers and placed on American establishment, in 1779, as 2nd American Regiment, part of the regular, British Army) (1778-1782)
Volunteers of New England
West Florida Royal Foresters
West Jersey Volunteers

Antigua

Australia

Barbados
Barbados Volunteer Force

Bermuda
Bermuda Militias 1612-1815
Bermuda Volunteer Rifle Corps (1894–1965)
Bermuda Militia Artillery (1895–1965)
Bermuda Volunteer Engineers (1931-1946)
Bermuda Militia Infantry (1939-1946)
Bermuda Home Guard
Bermuda Regiment (1965–Present)
Bermuda Cadet Corps (19th Century-2013)
Air Training Corps
Bermuda Sea Cadet Corps (1968–Present)

British Guiana
 British Guiana Volunteer Force (BGVF)

British Honduras 
 The Prince Regent's Royal Militia (1817-1866)
 The Belize Volunteer Force (1866-1868)
 The Belize Volunteer Corps (1868-1883)
 The Belize Light Infantry Volunteer Force (1897-1905)
 British Honduras Volunteers (1905-1916)
 British Honduras Territorial Force (1916-1928)
 British Honduras Defense Force (1928-1944)
 British Honduras Home Guard (1942-1943)
 British Honduras Volunteer Guard (1943-1973)
 Belize Volunteer Guard (1973-1977)

Burma
Burma Royal Navy Volunteer Reserve

Canada

 Provincial Marine

Ceylon
Ceylon Volunteers (1881–1910)
Ceylon Defence Force (1910–1948)
Ceylon Royal Naval Volunteer Reserve

Dominica 
Dominica Defence Force

Falkland Islands
Falkland Islands Defence Force (1892–Present)

Fiji
Fiji Defence Force

Gibraltar
Royal Gibraltar Regiment

Gold Coast
Gold Coast Constabulary

Grenada
Grenada Defence Force

Guernsey

High Commission Territories
African Auxiliary Pioneer Corps (1941-1946)

Hong Kong
Royal Hong Kong Regiment (1854–1997)

India

Cavalry
The Allahabad Light Horse
The Assam Valley Light Horse
The Bihar Light Horse
The Bombay Light Horse
The Calcutta Light Horse
The Cawnpore Light Horse
The Ghazipur Light Horse
The Gorakhpur Light Horse
The Northern Bengal Mounted Rifles
The Oudh Light Horse
The Punjab Light Horse
The Surma Valley Light Horse

Infantry

The Agra Volunteer Rifle Corps
The Allahabad Rifles
The Assam Bengal Railway Battalion
The Baluchistan Volunteer Rifle Corps
The Bangalore Contingent
The Bengal and North West Railway Battalion
The Bengal Nagpur Railway Battalion
The Bombay, Baroda and Central India Railway Regiment
The Bombay Volunteer Rifles Corps
The Calcutta and Presidency Battalion
The Calcutta Presidency Battalion
The Cawnpore Rifles
The Chota Nagpur Regiment
The Coorg and Mysore Company
The Coorg and Mysore Rifles
The Dehra Dun Mounted Rifles
The East Coast Battalion
The East Indian Railway Regiment
The Eastern Bengal Company
The Eastern Bengal Railway Battalion
The Great Indian Peninsula Railway Regiment
The Hyderabad Rifles
The Kolar Goldfields Battalion
The Lucknow Volunteer Rifle Corps
The Madras and Southern Mahratta Railway Rifles
The Madras Guards
The Malabar Volunteer Rifles
The Malwah Bheel Corps
Meywa Bheel Corps
The Midlands Volunteer Rifle Corps
The Moulmein Volunteer Rifle Corps
The Mussourie Battalion
The Nagpur Rifles
The Naini Tal Volunteer Rifles
The Nilgiri Malabar Battalion
The Northern Bengal Mounted Rifles
The North West Railway Battalion
The Oudh and Rohilkhand Railway Battalion
The Poona Rifles
The Shillong Volunteer Rifles
The Simla Rifles
The South Andaman Volunteer Rifles Corps
The South Indian Railway Battalion
The Yercaud Volunteer Rifle Corps

Iraq
 Iraq Levies

Jamaica
Jamaica Militia Artillery
Jamaica Engineer Corps
Kingston (later Jamaica) Infantry Volunteers
Jamaica Home Guard
consolidated postwar to form:
Jamaica Defence Force

Jersey

Kenya
Kenya Regiment

Leeward Island
Leewards Islands Battalion (1943-1945)
Leewards Home Guard

Malaya
Malay States Volunteer Rifles (1915–1936)
Malayan Naval Volunteer Reserve

Malta
King's Own Malta Regiment

Mauritius
 Mauritius Territorial Force
 Mauritius Defence Force
 Mauritius Regiment

Montserrat
 Royal Montserrat Defence Force

New Zealand
Waikato Mounted Rifles
Hauraki Regiment

Nigeria

Rhodesia/Nyasaland
 British South Africa Police
 Northern Rhodesia Police
 Nyasaland Police
 Nyasaland Volunteer Reserve
 Royal Rhodesia Regiment
 Northern Rhodesia Regiment
  Rhodesian Native Regiment
 1st (Nyasaland) Battalion King’s African Rifles
 2nd (Nyasaland) Battalion King’s African Rifles
 22nd (Nyasaland) Battalion King’s African Rifles
 Southern Rhodesian Reconnaissance Regiment
 ’C’ Squadron, Special Air Service Regiment
 Rhodesian Light Infantry

St Christopher Nevis
Saint Kitts and Nevis Defence Force

Singapore
Singapore Volunteer Corps
Singapore Naval Volunteer Force

St Lucia
St. Lucia Volunteer Corps

St Vincent

Sudan
Sudan Defence Force

Trinidad/Tobago
Trinidad Volunteers (expanded during WWII to form:)
Trinidad Regiment
Trinidad Volunteer Artillery
Trinidad Home Guard

Uganda
Uganda Volunteer Reserve

West Indies
 West India Regiment

Zanzibar
Zanzibar Volunteer Defence Force

Medals
 Efficiency Decoration
 Efficiency Medal
 Colonial Auxiliary Forces Officers' Decoration
 Colonial Auxiliary Forces Long Service Medal

References & External links

British colonial regiments
Lists of military units and formations
Lists of military units and formations of the United Kingdom
Reserve forces of the United Kingdom